Sir Andrew Stewart Mackenzie  (born 20 December 1956) is a Scottish businessman, who is the chairman of Shell plc and formerly CEO of BHP Billiton, the world's largest mining company. He succeeded Marius Kloppers, on 10 May 2013, and was succeeded by Mike Henry, at the start of 2020.

Early life 
Andrew Stewart Mackenzie was born in December 1956, grew up in Kirkintilloch, Scotland, and was educated at the University of St Andrews where he graduated with a first class bachelor's degree in geology in 1977. He went on to study at the University of Bristol where he was awarded a PhD in organic chemistry in 1981.

Career
Mackenzie was a postdoctoral research fellow with the British Geological Society. He was a Humboldt fellow and worked at the Nuclear Research Centre in Jülich, Germany. He published over 50 research papers as a scientist.

In 1983, Mackenzie joined BP's research division. He worked his way to BP Finance, and then as head of capital markets. After 22 years at BP, he left as group vice-president petrochemicals.

In April 2004, Mackenzie joined Rio Tinto as chief executive of the industrial minerals division. In June 2007, he served as the chief executive officer, diamonds & minerals.

He served as trustee of a think tank, Demos, from 2005 until June 2008.

Mackenzie was poached from Rio Tinto in 2007 by then CEO of BHP Billiton Marius Kloppers, ahead of a failed takeover bid of Rio Tinto.  Mackenzie became the chief executive of non-ferrous in BHP Billiton in November 2008. He succeeded Marius Kloppers as the CEO of BHP Billiton in May 2013. In 2014, he was paid $7,123,000 in total compensation.  Australia mining head Mike Henry succeeded Mackenzie as BHP CEO on 1 January 2020.

In March 2021, Mackenzie was tapped to replace Chad Holliday as company chair of Royal Dutch Shell starting May 2021.

In June 2021, Mackenzie was selected to be Chair of UK Research and Innovation to replace Sir John Kingman.

Awards and honours
Mackenzie was elected a fellow of the Royal Society in 2014. His nomination reads 

Mackenzie was knighted in the 2020 Birthday Honours for services to business, science, technology and UK/Australia relations.

Personal life
Mackenzie speaks five languages. He met his wife, Liz, whilst they were students at St Andrews.

References 

Scottish chief executives
Alumni of the University of St Andrews
Alumni of the University of Bristol
Businesspeople awarded knighthoods
Fellows of the Royal Society
Knights Bachelor
Living people
1956 births
Scottish geologists
BP people
BHP people
People of Rio Tinto (corporation)